Centrolene paezorum is a species of frog in the family Centrolenidae.
It is endemic to Colombia.
Its natural habitats are subtropical or tropical moist montane forests and rivers.

References

Sources
 

paezorum
Amphibians of Colombia
Amphibians of the Andes
Taxonomy articles created by Polbot
Amphibians described in 1986